K. M. George (18 January 1919  11 December 1976) was an Indian politician from the state of Kerala. He is the founder Chairman of Kerala Congress, a political party in India.

Political career

K. M. George began his political career in the Indian National Congress. Following the death of P. T. Chacko, Pullolil in 1964 under turbulent circumstances, 15 MLAs under the leadership of K. M. George withdrew their support to the Congress party and, sitting as a separate group in the Assembly, brought down the R. Sankar ministry and formed a new political party called the Kerala Congress under his chairmanship at Kottayam.

Personal life
George was born in Muvattupuzha on 18 January 1919. He was married to Marthamma Padinjarekkara and was survived by five children, one of whom is K. Francis George, who has represented the constituency of Idukki twice in the Parliament of India. George died on 11 December 1976, while serving as a minister in the cabinet of C. Achutha Menon.

References

1919 births
1976 deaths
People from Muvattupuzha
Indian National Congress politicians from Kerala
Kerala MLAs 1957–1959
Kerala MLAs 1960–1964
Kerala Congress politicians